Claude Rossi (born 22 December 1937 in Monaco) is a sailor from Monaco, who represented his country at the 1976 Summer Olympics in Kingston, Ontario, Canada as crew member in the Soling. With helmsman Gérard Battaglia and fellow crew member Jean-Pierre Borro they took the 23rd place.

Sources
 

Living people
1937 births
Sailors at the 1976 Summer Olympics – Soling
Olympic sailors of Monaco
Monegasque male sailors (sport)